Topaz Page-Green is a fashion model and the founder  and president of the non-profit corporation The Lunchbox Fund.

Early life and education
Topaz Page-Green was born in 1979 and raised near Johannesburg, South Africa.  Her father and mother were geologists.

She attended Kingsmead College, an all-girls private school in Johannesburg.

Career
After graduating high school, Page-Green began her career in modelling after moving to London. While travelling on London's Underground she was noticed by a model scout and signed soon after with a talent agency. On a trip home to South Africa in 2003     she was confronted with the extreme poverty of her country, and decided to do something about it.  In 2005, she launched The Lunchbox Fund as her response to this poverty. The fund raises money to provide one meal a day to poor and at-risk students in township high schools in South Africa. 
  
She studied Africa, sociology and human rights at the New York University’s Gallatin School of Individualized Study.

The Lunchbox Fund
Page-Green founded The Lunchbox Fund in 2005. The fund provides one meal each day to 22,000 underprivileged high school students, totaling more than 2.6 million meals a year.  The Lunchbox Fund began in the historically at-risk Soweto district of Johannesburg.

Feedie
Page-Green created Feedie, an app which is credited as being the “first philanthropic food app.” Designed to be used by ‘foodies’ and others, the Feedie application uses social media to transform people's passion for sharing their photos of food into the sharing of actual food with school children in need via The Lunchbox Fund.

Recognition
In September 2015 fashion designer Kenneth Cole included Page-Green in his “Courageous Class” ad campaign re-affirming his brand's motto, “Look Good, For Good.” 

Forbes included Topaz Page-Green in their list of the “World’s Most Powerful Business Women” in 2015.

Personal life and style
Page-Green lives in an apartment in New York City's East Village. She has lived in New York since 2001.  Page-Green is a vegetarian, and eats “mostly vegan” food. She was in a relationship with actor Joaquin Phoenix from 2001 to 2005.

References

Living people
1979 births
South African female models
People from Johannesburg
South African philanthropists
New York University Gallatin School of Individualized Study alumni
People from the East Village, Manhattan